Rasheim Ali Abdul Wright (born July 21, 1981) is an American-Jordanian basketball player. He is 6'4" and plays guard. In 2007, he received Jordanian citizenship. As of 2011 he played for Anibal Zahle in the Lebanese Basketball League.

National team career

2007 FIBA Asia Championship 
Wright debuted at the 2007 FIBA Asia Championship a qualification to the 2008 Beijing Olympics. He led his team with an average of 18.1 ppg in the said tournament, However Jordan was eliminated in the Quarterfinals thus earning them a decent 5th place finish.

2009 FIBA Asia Championship 
Wright played with the Jordanian national team on the 2009 FIBA Asia Championship he led his team to reach the semifinals before losing to Iran 75-77. On the bronze medal match he helped Jordan beating Lebanon 80-66 to clinch a spot for the 2010 FIBA World Championships in Turkey.

References

External links
 Eurobasket.com profile
 RealGM profile

1981 births
Living people
2010 FIBA World Championship players
African-American basketball players
American emigrants to Jordan
American expatriate basketball people in Argentina
American expatriate basketball people in Armenia
American expatriate basketball people in Bahrain
American expatriate basketball people in Bosnia and Herzegovina
American expatriate basketball people in Georgia (country)
American expatriate basketball people in Iran
American expatriate basketball people in Jordan
American expatriate basketball people in Lebanon
American expatriate basketball people in Libya
American expatriate basketball people in Mexico
American expatriate basketball people in Morocco
American expatriate basketball people in the Philippines
American expatriate basketball people in Qatar
American expatriate basketball people in Saudi Arabia
American expatriate basketball people in Tunisia
American expatriate basketball people in Turkey
American expatriate basketball people in Venezuela
American men's basketball players
Atenas basketball players
Basketball players from Philadelphia
Guaiqueríes de Margarita players
Jordanian men's basketball players
Jordanian people of African-American descent
Junior college men's basketball players in the United States
KK Bosna Royal players
Mahram Tehran BC players
Naturalized citizens of Jordan
Shooting guards
UDC Firebirds men's basketball players
Zain Club basketball players
Philippine Patriots players
21st-century African-American sportspeople
20th-century African-American people
Martin Luther King High School (Philadelphia) alumni